Electronic Commerce Research is a peer-reviewed academic journal published by Springer Science+Business Media. The journal focuses on disseminating the latest findings in all facets of electronic commerce. A sampling of topics published in the journal as they relate to the Internet and electronic commerce include intelligent agents technologies and their impact; economics of electronic commerce; virtual electronic commerce systems; service creation and provisioning; supply chain management through the internet; collaborative learning, gaming, and work; and workflow for electronic commerce applications.

Abstracting and indexing 
Electronic Commerce Research is abstracted and indexed in DBLP, Journal Citation Reports, Research Papers in Economics SCImago Journal Rank, Scopus, Social Sciences Citation Index, among others. According to the Journal Citation Reports, the journal has a 2019 impact factor of 2.507, ranking it 77th out of 152 journals in the category "Business" and 111th out of 226 journals in the category "Management".

External links

References 

Business and management journals
Publications established in 2001
Springer Science+Business Media academic journals
English-language journals